Coldfoot Airport  is a state-owned, public-use airport located in Coldfoot, in the Yukon-Koyukuk Census Area in the U.S. state of Alaska.

Facilities and aircraft 
It has one runway designated 1/19 with a gravel surface measuring 4,000 by 100 feet (1,219 x 30 m). For the 12-month period ending December 31, 2005, the airport had 1,000 aircraft operations, an average of 83 per month: 80% air taxi and 20% general aviation.

Airlines and destinations

Statistics

References

External links
 

Airports in the Arctic
Airports in the Yukon–Koyukuk Census Area, Alaska